Progress M-24M, identified by NASA as Progress 56P, is a Progress spacecraft used by Roskosmos to resupply the International Space Station (ISS) during 2014. Progress M-24M was launched on a six-hours rendezvous profile towards the ISS. The 24th Progress-M 11F615A60 spacecraft to be launched, it had the serial number 424 and was built by RKK Energia.

Launch
The spacecraft was launched on 23 July 2014 at 21:44:44 UTC from the Baikonur Cosmodrome in Kazakhstan.

Docking
Progress M-24M docked with the Pirs docking compartment on 24 July 2014 at 03:31 UTC, less than six hours after launch.

Cargo
The Progress spacecraft carries 2322 kg of cargo and supplies to the International Space Station.

See also

 2014 in spaceflight

References

External links

Progress (spacecraft) missions
Spacecraft launched in 2014
Spacecraft which reentered in 2014
2014 in Russia
Spacecraft launched by Soyuz-U rockets
Supply vehicles for the International Space Station